A paucimorphism is a genetic sequence variant with a rare allele frequency of 0.0005<q<0.05.

References

DNA